This is a list of Occupy movement topics on Wikipedia. The Occupy movement is the international branch of the Occupy Wall Street movement that protests against social and economic inequality around the world, its primary goal being to make the economic and political relations in all societies less vertically hierarchical and more flatly distributed. Local groups often have different focuses, but the movement's principle focus is to highlight that  large corporations (and the global financial system) control the world in a way that disproportionately benefits a minority, undermines democracy, and is unstable.

Occupy movement topics

  Occupy movement
  1% (South Park)
  15 October 2011 global protests
  99 Percenters
  Anarchism and the Occupy movement
  Anti-mask laws
  Bank Transfer Day
  Declaration (book)
  Fuelling Poverty
  General assembly (Occupy movement)
  Leah Hunt-Hendrix
  List of Occupy movement protest locations
  Mashtots Park Movement
  Min Reyes
  Occupy (book)
  Occupy Buffer Zone
  Occupy Faith
  Occupy Homes
  Occupy Love
  Occupy Sandy
  Occupy This Album
  Progressive stack
  Reactions to the Occupy movement
  We are the 99%

Occupy Wall Street

  Adbusters 
  Avoid pi 
  Charging Bull 
  Economic inequality
  Illuminator Art Collective
  Liberty Square Blueprint
  Occupy Comics  
  Occupy movement hand signals  
  Occupy the Hood
  Occupy Wall Street  
  OWS Media Group 
  Reactions to Occupy Wall Street 
  The Occupy Handbook 
  The People's Library 
  Thirty Meter Telescope protests 
  Timeline of Occupy Wall Street 
  1% (South Park) 
  V for Vendetta 
  Wall Street 
  Zuccotti Park 
  99 Percent Declaration 
  99%: The Occupy Wall Street Collaborative Film

Individuals

 David Graeber

  Foo Conner
  Lupe Fiasco 
  Jesse LaGreca
  Paul Mayer (activist) 
  Cecily McMillan
  Tim Pool 
  Kshama Sawant
  Justin Wedes
  Micah M. White

Location
List of Occupy movement protest locations

Hong Kong

  2014 Hong Kong protests
  Art of the Umbrella Movement
  Boundless Oceans, Vast Skies
  Gau wu
  Lennon Wall Hong Kong
  Reactions to the 2014 Hong Kong protests
  Umbrella Movement
  Umbrella Square
  Umbrella Ultra Marathon

United Kingdom

  Bank of Ideas
  Bloomsbury Social Centre
  Occupy Bath
  Occupy Edinburgh
  Occupy Glasgow
  Occupy London
  The Occupied Times of London

United States

  Law enforcement and the Occupy movement
  List of Occupy movement protest locations in the United States
  Occupy movement in the United States
  List of Occupy movement protest locations in California
  Occupy San José
  Occupy UC Davis
  UC Davis pepper-spray incident
  Occupy Cal
  Occupy Oakland
 Frank H. Ogawa Plaza
 2011 Oakland general strike
 Jean Quan
 Timeline of Occupy Oakland
  General assembly (Occupy movement)
  Human microphone
  Occupy Ashland
  Occupy Atlanta
  Occupy Austin
  Occupy Baltimore
  Occupy Boston
  Occupy Buffalo
  Occupy Charlotte
  Occupy Charlottesville
  Occupy Chicago
  Occupy D.C.
  Occupy Eugene
  Occupy Houston
  Occupy Las Vegas
  Occupy Los Angeles
  Occupy Minneapolis
  Occupy Monsanto
  Occupy movement hand signals
  Occupy Nashville
  Occupy OC
  Occupy Pittsburgh
  Occupy Philadelphia
  Occupy Portland
  Occupy Providence
  Occupy Redwood City
  Occupy Rochester NY
  Occupy Rose Parade
  Occupy Sacramento
  Occupy Salem
  Occupy Salt Lake City
  Occupy San Diego
  Occupy San Francisco
  Occupy Seattle
  Occupy St. Louis
  Occupy Texas State
  Occupy the Hood
  Occupy the Farm
  Occupy the SEC
  Occupy UC Davis
  Occupy Unmasked
  Occupy Vanderbilt
  Occupy Wall Street
  Progressive stack
  Thirty Meter Telescope protests

Other locations

  Blockupy (Frankfurt)
  Occupy Baluwatar
  Occupy Berlin
  Occupy Buffer Zone
  Occupy Canada
  Occupy Central (2011–12)
  Occupy Cork
  Occupy Dame Street
  Occupy Dataran
  Occupy Ghana
  Occupy Harvard
  Occupy Melbourne
  Occupy Nigeria
  Occupy protests in New Zealand
  Occupy Reykjavík
  Occupy Oslo
  Occupy Ottawa
  Occupy South Africa
  Occupy Sydney
  Occupy Toronto
  Occupy Windsor
  2011 Rome demonstration

See also
 Economic inequality

References

Further reading

External links

 Occupy Wall Street: List and map of over 200 U.S. solidarity events and Facebook pages. October 4, 2011. Daily Kos.